The Scarf may refer to:

The Scarf (film), 1951 American thriller
The Scarf (opera), 1955 chamber opera
The Scarf (novel) by Robert Bloch, originally written in 1947, revised 1966

See also
Scarf (disambiguation)
Arthur Stewart King Scarf (1913–1941), VC recipient